Kheireddine "Kiko" Zarabi (born 18 July 1984) is an Algerian professional footballer who plays as a central defender.

Club career
Born in Hussein Dey District, Algiers, Zarabi started his career at age 10 with IRB Ouargla. When he turned 13 his family returned to live in the capital, and he joined NA Hussein Dey first before leaving to RC Kouba two years later; he made his senior debut with the latter in 2002, remaining three seasons with the club.

In May 2005, Zarabi went on trial with French Ligue 2 side FC Lorient. However, nothing came of it, and he returned to his homeland where he successively represented ES Sétif and CR Belouizdad.

Zarabi signed a two and a half year contract with Finland's Turun Palloseura in late 2007. On 19 January 2009, he moved to Portugal where he would remain the following years, with C.F. Os Belenenses, Vitória de Setúbal, Leixões S.C. and F.C. Arouca, the first two teams in the Primeira Liga and the other in the second division.

In his second season with Arouca, Zarabi contributed 14 matches and two goals as the Aveiro District club reached the top flight for the first time in its history. A brief spell in the French Ligue 2 with Nîmes Olympique notwithstanding, he continued competing in the Portuguese second tier until his retirement, with C.F. União, S.C. Covilhã and C.D. Cova da Piedade.

International career
During his time at Kouba, Zarabi was a regular member of the Algeria under-23 team and participated in various tournaments, most notably the 2005 Mediterranean Games.

Personal life
Zarabi's father, Abdelaziz, was also a footballer and a full Algerian international. His older brother, Abderraouf, also a defender, also played with Hussein Dey and in Finland.

References

External links

1984 births
Living people
People from Hussein Dey (commune)
21st-century Algerian people
Algerian footballers
Association football defenders
Algerian Ligue Professionnelle 1 players
RC Kouba players
ES Sétif players
CR Belouizdad players
Veikkausliiga players
Turun Palloseura footballers
Primeira Liga players
Liga Portugal 2 players
C.F. Os Belenenses players
Vitória F.C. players
Leixões S.C. players
F.C. Arouca players
C.F. União players
S.C. Covilhã players
C.D. Cova da Piedade players
Ligue 2 players
Nîmes Olympique players
Algeria under-23 international footballers
Competitors at the 2005 Mediterranean Games
Mediterranean Games competitors for Algeria
Algerian expatriate footballers
Expatriate footballers in Finland
Expatriate footballers in Portugal
Expatriate footballers in France
Algerian expatriate sportspeople in Finland
Algerian expatriate sportspeople in Portugal
Algerian expatriate sportspeople in France